Thomas Hope Hospital is a health facility in Strand Street, Langholm, Dumfries and Galloway, Scotland. It is managed by NHS Dumfries and Galloway.

History 
The facility was financed by a large legacy from Thomas Hope, a retailing entrepreneur who had worked in the United States. It was designed by John Henry Townsend Wodd in the Jacobean style and opened as the Thomas Hope Hospital for the Poor in 1897. The design included an octagonal mortuary. The hospital joined the National Health Service as the Thomas Hope Hospital in 1948.

References 

Hospitals in Dumfries and Galloway
NHS Scotland hospitals
1897 establishments in Scotland
Hospitals established in 1897
Hospital buildings completed in 1897
Langholm